In mathematics, a Redheffer matrix, often denoted  as studied by , is a square (0,1) matrix whose entries aij are 1 if i divides j or if j = 1; otherwise, aij = 0. It is useful in some contexts to express Dirichlet convolution, or convolved divisors sums, in terms of matrix products involving the transpose of the  Redheffer matrix.

Variants and definitions of component matrices

The remaining one-valued entries in  then correspond to the divisibility condition reflected by the matrix , which plainly can be seen by an application of Mobius inversion is always invertible with inverse . We then have a characterization of the singularity of  expressed by 

If we define the function

then we can define the  Redheffer (transpose) matrix to be the nxn square matrix  in usual matrix notation. We will continue to make use this notation throughout the next sections.

Examples

The matrix below is the 12 × 12 Redheffer matrix.

A corresponding application of the Mobius inversion formula shows that the  Redheffer transpose matrix is always invertible, with inverse entries given by

where  denotes the Moebius function. In this case, we have that the  inverse Redheffer transpose matrix is given by

Key properties

Singularity and relations to the Mertens function and special series

Determinants

The determinant of the nxn square Redheffer matrix is given by the Mertens function M(n). In particular, the matrix  is not invertible precisely when the Mertens function is zero (or is close to changing signs). This results in an interesting characterization that the Mertens function can only change signs infinitely often if the Redheffer matrix  is singular at infinitely many natural numbers, which is widely believed to be the case with respect to the oscillatory behavior of  The determinants of the Redheffer matrices are immediately tied to the Riemann Hypothesis (RH) through this intimate relation with the Mertens function as the RH is equivalent to showing that  for all (sufficiently small) .

Factorizations of sums encoded by these matrices

In a somewhat unconventional construction which reinterprets the (0,1) matrix entries to denote inclusion in some increasing sequence of indexing sets, we can see that these matrices are also related to factorizations of Lambert series. This observation is offered in so much as for a fixed arithmetic function f, the coefficients of the next Lambert series expansion over f provide a so-called inclusion mask for the indices over which we sum f to arrive at the series coefficients of these expansions. Notably, observe that

Now in the special case of these divisor sums, which we can see from the above expansion, are codified by boolean (zero-one) valued inclusion in the sets of divisors of a natural number n, it is possible to re-interpret the Lambert series generating functions which enumerate these sums via yet another matrix-based construction. Namely, Merca and Schmidt (2017-2018) proved invertible matrix factorizations expanding these generating functions in the form of 

Merca and Schmidt (2017) also proved a simple inversion formula which allows the implicit function f to be expressed as a sum over the convolved coefficients  of the original Lambert series generating function in the form of 

where p(n) denotes the partition function,  is the Moebius function, and the coefficients of  inherit a quadratic dependence on j through the pentagonal number theorem. 
This inversion formula is compared to the inverses (when they exist) of the Redheffer matrices  for the sake of completion here.

Other than that the underlying so-termed mask matrix which specifies the inclusion of indices in the divisor sums at hand are invertible, utilizing this type of construction to expand other Redheffer-like matrices for other special number theoretic sums need not be limited to those forms classically studied here. For example, in 2018 Mousavi and Schmidt extend such matrix based factorization lemmas to the cases of Anderson-Apostol divisor sums (of which Ramanujan sums are a notable special case) and sums indexed over the integers that are relatively prime to each n (for example, as classically defines the tally denoted by the Euler phi function). More to the point, the examples considered in the applications section below suggest a study of the properties of what can be considered generalized Redheffer matrices representing other special number theoretic sums.

Spectral radius and eigenspaces

which bounds the asymptotic behavior of the spectrum of  when n is large. It can also be shown that , and by a careful analysis (see the characteristic polynomial expansions below) that .
 The matrix  has eigenvalue one with multiplicity .
 The dimension of the eigenspace  corresponding to the eigenvalue  is known to be . In particular, this implies that  is not diagonalizable whenever . 

Characterizing eigenvectors

We have that  is an eigenvector of  corresponding to some eigenvalue  in the spectrum of  if and only if for  the following two conditions hold:

If we restrict ourselves to the so-called non-trivial cases where , then given any initial eigenvector component  we can recursively compute the remaining n-1 components according to the formula

With this in mind, for  we can define the sequences of

There are a couple of curious implications related to the definitions of these sequences. First, we have that  if and only if

Secondly, we have an established formula for the Dirichlet series, or Dirichlet generating function, over these sequences for fixed  which holds for all  given by

where  of course as usual denotes the Riemann zeta function.

Bounds and properties of non-trivial eigenvalues

Estimates of the sizes of the Jordan blocks of  corresponding to the eigenvalue one are given in. A brief overview of the properties of a modified approach to factorizing the characteristic polynomial, of these matrices is defined here without the full scope of the somewhat technical proofs justifying the bounds from the references cited above. Namely, let the shorthand  and define a sequence of auxiliary polynomial expansions according to the formula

where  is Euler's classical gamma constant, and where the remaining coefficients of these polynomials are bounded by

The next image is reproduced from a freely available article cited above when  is available here for reference.

Applications and generalizations

We provide a few examples of the utility of the Redheffer matrices interpreted as a (0,1) matrix whose parity corresponds to inclusion in an increasing sequence of index sets. These examples should serve to freshen up some of the at times dated historical perspective of these matrices, and their being footnote-worthy by virtue of an inherent, and deep, relation of their determinants to the Mertens function and equivalent statements of the Riemann Hypothesis. This interpretation is a great deal more combinatorial in construction than typical treatments of the special Redheffer matrix determinants. Nonetheless, this combinatorial twist on enumerating special sequences of sums has been explored more recently in a number of papers and is a topic of active interest in pre-print archives. Before diving into the full construction of this spin on the Redheffer matrix variants  defined above, observe that this type of expansion is in many ways essentially just another variation of the usage of a Toeplitz matrix to represent truncated power series expressions where the matrix entries are coefficients of the formal variable in the series. Let's explore an application of this particular view of a (0,1) matrix as masking inclusion of summation indices in a finite sum over some fixed function. The inverse matrix terms are referred to a generalized Mobius function within the context of sums of this type in.

Matrix products expanding Dirichlet convolutions and Dirichlet inverses

First, given any two non-identically-zero arithmetic functions f and g, we can provide explicit matrix representations which encode their Dirichlet convolution in rows indexed by natural numbers :

Then letting  denote the vector of all ones, it is easily seen that the  row of the matrix-vector product  gives the convolved Dirichlet sums

for all  where the upper index  is arbitrary.

One task that is particularly onerous given an arbitrary function f is to determine its Dirichlet inverse exactly without resorting to a standard recursive definition of this function via yet another convolved divisor sum involving the same function f with its under-specified inverse to be determined:

It is clear that in general the Dirichlet inverse  for f, i.e., the uniquely defined arithmetic function such that , involves sums of nested divisor sums of depth from one to  where this upper bound is the prime omega function which counts the number of distinct prime factors of n. As this example shows, we can formulate an alternate way to construct the Dirichlet inverse function values via matrix inversion with our variant Redheffer matrices, .

Generalizations of the Redheffer matrix forms: GCD sums and other matrices whose entries denote inclusion in special sets

There are several often cited articles from worthy journals that fight to establish expansions of number theoretic divisor sums, convolutions, and Dirichlet series (to name a few) through matrix representations. Besides non-trivial estimates on the corresponding spectrum and eigenspaces associated with truly notable and important applications of these representations—the underlying machinery in representing sums of these forms by matrix products is to effectively define a so-termed masking matrix whose zero-or-one valued entries denote inclusion in an increasing sequence of sets of the natural numbers . To illustrate that the previous mouthful of jargon makes good sense in setting up a matrix based system for representing a wide range of special summations, consider the following construction: Let  be a sequence of index sets, and for any fixed arithmetic function  define the sums

One of the classes of sums considered by Mousavi and Schmidt (2017) defines the relatively prime divisor sums by setting the index sets in the last definition to be

This class of sums can be used to express important special arithmetic functions of number theoretic interest, including Euler's phi function (where classically we define ) as

and even the Mobius function through its representation as a discrete (finite) Fourier transform:

Citations in the full paper provide other examples of this class of sums including applications to cyclotomic polynomials (and their logarithms). The referenced article by Mousavi and Schmidt (2017) develops a factorization-theorem-like treatment to expanding these sums which is an analog to the Lambert series factorization results given in the previous section above. These inverse matrices have many curious properties (and a good reference pulling together a summary of all of them is currently lacking) which are best intimated and conveyed to new readers by inspection. With this in mind, consider the case of the upper index  and the relevant matrices defined for this case given as follows:

Examples of invertible matrices which define other special sums with non-standard, however, clear applications should be catalogued and listed in this generalizations section for completeness. An existing summary of inversion relations, and in particular, exact criteria under which sums of these forms can be inverted and related is found in many references on orthogonal polynomials. Other good examples of this type of factorization treatment to inverting relations between sums over sufficiently invertible, or well enough behaved triangular sets of weight coefficients include the Mobius inversion formula, the binomial transform, and the Stirling transform, among others.

See also
 Redheffer star product

References

External links and citations to related work

Matrices
Number theory